Sagittaria cuneata is a species of flowering plant in the water plantain family known by the common name arumleaf arrowhead or duck potato. Like some other Sagittaria species, it may be called wapato. It is native to much of North America, including most of Canada (every province and territory except Nunavut) as well as the western and northeastern United States (New England, Great Lakes, Great Plains, Rocky Mountain, Great Basin and Pacific Coast states; including Alaska but not Hawaii).

Sagittaria cuneata is an aquatic plant, growing in slow-moving and stagnant water bodies such as ponds and small streams. It is quite variable in appearance, and submerged parts of the plant look different from those growing above the surface or on land. In general it is a perennial herb growing from a white or blue-tinged tuber. The leaves are variable in shape, many of them sagittate (arrow-shaped) with two smaller, pointed lobes opposite the tip. The leaf blades are borne on very long petioles. The plant is monoecious, with individuals bearing both male and female flowers. The inflorescence which rises above the surface of the water is a raceme made up of several whorls of flowers, the lowest node bearing female flowers and upper nodes bearing male flowers. The flower is up to 2.5 centimeters wide with white petals. The male flowers have rings of yellow stamens at the centers. Each female flower has a spherical cluster of pistils which develops into a group of tiny fruits.

Conservation status in the United States

It is listed as endangered in Connecticut and New Jersey. It is listed as threatened in Massachusetts, New Hampshire, and Ohio.

Native American ethnobotany
The Cheyenne give dried leaves to horses for urinary troubles and for a sore mouth. The Klamath use the rootstocks as food. The Menominee string the dried, boiled, sliced potatoes together for winter use. The Ojibwe eat the corms for indigestion, and also as a food, eaten boiled fresh, dried or candied with maple sugar. Muskrat and beavers store them in large caches, which they have learned to recognize and appropriate. The Northern Paiute use the roots for food. The indigenous people of Montana use eat the tubers raw and boiled.

References

External links
Washington Burke Museum ''Sagittaria cuneata'
Photo gallery ''Sagittaria cuneata'
Washington State Department of Ecology, Shoreline Plants, Sagittaria cuneata
Plants for a Future, Sagittaria cuneata
Wildflowers of the Pacific Northwest, Turner Photographics, Sagittaria cuneata arum-leaf arrowhead

cuneata
Freshwater plants
Edible plants
Plants described in 1893
Flora of Canada
Flora of Alaska
Flora of the United States
Plants used in Native American cuisine
Plants used in traditional Native American medicine
Flora without expected TNC conservation status